Robert Goldman (born 1953) is a French songwriter. He was born in Paris, the son of Alter Mojze Goldman and Ruth Ambrunn who were Jewish Resistance fighters during the Second World War. He is the younger brother of Jean-Jacques Goldman and half-brother of Pierre Goldman.

He has written more than 50 songs for many French-speaking singers such as Céline Dion. He often signed J Kapler.

Songs composed by Robert Goldman/J.Kapler

Vanessa Amorosi 
"Champagne, Champagne" (B.O Absolument fabuleux, 2001)

France D'Amour 
Ce qui me reste de toi (France d'Amour, 2002)
Je n'irai pas ailleurs (France d'Amour, 2002)
Le bonheur me fait peur (France d'Amour, 2002)
Quand je me love en toi (France d'Amour, 2002)
Que des mots (France d'Amour, 2002)
Vous étiez (France d'Amour, 2002)

Lisa Angell
N'oubliez pas (2015)

Tina Arena 
Aller plus haut (In deep, 1999)
S'il faut prier (Un Autre Univers, 2005)
Tu aurais dû me dire (Un Autre Univers, 2005)

Chimène Badi 
Le jour d'après (Dis-moi que tu m'aimes, 2004)
J'aurais préféré (Dis-moi que tu m'aimes, 2004)
Le chant des hommes (Le miroir, 2006)
N'oublie pas (Le miroir, 2006)

Isabelle Boulay 
Parle-moi (Mieux qu'ici-bas, 2000)
Quelques pleurs (Mieux qu'ici-bas, 2000)
Quand vos cœurs m'appellent (Mieux qu'ici-bas, 2000)
Sans toi (Au moment d'être à vous, 2002)

Noémie Christiaens 
J'étais prête (?, 2004)

Céline Dion 
I don't know (Falling into You, 1996)
Je sais pas (D'eux, 1995)
Je t'aime encore (anglais) (One heart, 2003)
Je t'aime encore (français) (1 fille et 4 types, 2003)
Valse adieu (1 fille et 4 types, 2003)
Zora sourit (S'il suffisait d'aimer, 1998)

Lauren Faure 
Une femme qui pleure (Regards de femme, 2002)

Florence 
Si demain ne sert à rien (Poker menteur, 2003)

Patricia Kaas 
Je le garde pour toi (Sexe fort, 2003)

Claire Keim 
Je ne veux qu'elle (Marc Lavoine, 2001) en duo avec Marc Lavoine

Angélique Kidjo 
Ne cédez jamais (Black Ivory Soul, 2002)

Marc Lavoine 
Je ne veux qu'elle (Marc Lavoine, 2001) en duo avec Claire Keim, sous le pseudonyme de Moïse Albert

Frédéric Lerner 
Si tu m'entends (On partira, 2000)

Marilou 
Aimer (La fille qui chante, 2005)

Sofia Mestari 
Derrière les voiles (2001)

Yannick Noah 
Angela (Frontières, 2010)
Couleurs d'aimer (Charango, 2006)
Frontières (Frontières, 2010)
J'aurais dû comprendre (Pokhara, 2003)
Jamafrica (Yannick Noah, 2000)
La voix des sages (Yannick Noah, 2000)
Laissez-nous essayer (Pokhara, 2003)
Madingwa (Yannick Noah, 2000)
Quand ils sont là (Pokhara, 2003)
Simon Papa Tara (Yannick Noah, 2000)
Si tu savais (Pokhara, 2003)
Te quiero (Charango, 2006)
Un jour « le combat » (Charango, 2006)
Yessaï (Pokhara, 2003)

Florent Pagny 
Une place pour moi (A/C Jean-Jacques Goldman / J. Kapler – Erick Benzi, Savoir aimer, 1997)

Michel Sardou 
Cette chanson n'en est pas une (Hors format, 2006)
Dis-moi (Du plaisir, 2004)
Du plaisir (Du plaisir, 2004)
J'ai tant d'amour (Du plaisir, 2004)
Je n'oublie pas (Du plaisir, 2004)
Le chant des hommes (Hors format, 2006)
Le cœur migrateur (Hors format, 2006)
Loin (Du plaisir, 2004)
Même si (Du plaisir, 2004)
Nuit de satin (Hors format, 2006)

Natasha Saint-Pier 
All I Have Is My Soul (2001)
Je n'ai que mon âme (A chacun son histoire, 2001)
Pourquoi tant de larmes (De l'amour le mieux, 2002)

Roch Voisine 
Dis-lui (Roch Voisine, 2001)
Julia (Roch Voisine, 2001)
Kibera (Roch Voisine, 2001)
Un océan de peine (Roch Voisine, 2001)

Francky Vincent 
Retourne-toi (under pseudonym : Yvon et Jacques Hulet)

Julie Zenatti 
Je voudrais que tu me consoles (Comme vous, 2004)
Rendez-moi le silence (Comme vous, 2004)

External links 
(fr) J. Kapler : l'autre Goldman (French site)
(fr) Autre Part : L'univers des frères Goldman (French site)

French songwriters
Male songwriters
20th-century French Jews
Living people
1953 births
Musicians from Paris